Arbre Serpents is a sculpture by Niki de Saint Phalle.

It showed at the Missouri Botanical Garden.
It is part of the National Museum of Women in the Arts, New York Avenue Sculpture Projekt.

Reviews

Jacqueline Trescott (2010). "National Museum of Women in the Arts to turn D.C. corridor into sculpture alley". Style. The Washington Post.  Retrieved 8 Feb 2011.
Blake Gopnik (2010). "Sculptures add color to New York Avenue, but are they art?". Style. The Washington Post. Retrieved 9 Feb 2011

y

See also
 List of public art in Washington, D.C., Ward 2

References

External links
NMWAs New York Avenue Sculpture Project Website
https://web.archive.org/web/20101215235154/http://mosaicbasics.com/MosaicTileExhibit.htm
https://www.flickr.com/photos/73059802@N00/485674820/

Outdoor sculptures in Washington, D.C.
Artworks in the collection of the National Museum of Women in the Arts
1999 sculptures
Fiberglass sculptures in Washington, D.C.
Snakes in art